Treated Timber Resists Rot is the third studio album by Xploding Plastix.

Track listing
"Kissed by a Kisser" - 6:46
"Errata" - 4:44
"The Rigamarole Shell Out" - 3:50
"A Rogue Friend is a Wild Beast" - 5:31
"The Cost of Resistance" - 5:27
"Joyous Insolence" - 5:51
"The Full Graft" - 5:11
"Bulldozer Butterfly" - 4:22
"Austere Faultlines" - 5:03
"Band of Miscreants" - 5:32
"Arts of Exit" - 4:23
"I Want My Violence Back" - 5:24

2008 albums
Xploding Plastix albums